"I Warn the Government" is a speech by F. E. Smith, made on 12 March 1906. It was his maiden speech in the British House of Commons. According to Brian MacArthur, it was "the most famous [speech] ever made" in the Commons in modern times. The historian Paul Johnson has described the speech as "without question the most famous maiden speech in history, quite unprecedented, and never equalled since." Smith used his opportunity as a member of the embattled Tory opposition of 1906 to decry and assail the government for their heavy-handedness and arrogance after winning a landslide victory in the general election. After this speech, Tim Healy, the Irish Nationalist, a master of parliamentary invective, sent Smith a note, "I am old, and you are young, but you have beaten me at my own game." The speech solidified Smith's reputation as an orator and rising political star, and established him as a major figure within the Conservative Party. His place in party politics thus established, F.E. Smith would go on to hold numerous posts and cabinet positions under the later Lloyd George Coalition Government, as Lord Chancellor from 1918 to 1922, and under Stanley Baldwin as Secretary of State for India in 1924–1928.

A copy of the speech was included in the following day's Times, which is archived online.

In part, the speech reads:

External links
 Description of speech
 Hansard 12 March 1906 vol 153 col 1014

Speeches in the Parliament of the United Kingdom
1906 speeches
1906 in London
1906 in politics
March 1906 events